Gömü is a village in the Amasra District, Bartın Province, Turkey. Its population is 457 (2021).

History 
The village has had the same name since 1928.

Geography 
The village is 13 km from Bartın city center and 4 km from Amasra town centre. Kuşkayası Monument is located near the village.

References

Villages in Amasra District